Dahlia Lithwick is a Canadian-American lawyer, writer, and journalist. Lithwick is currently a contributing editor at Newsweek and senior editor at Slate. She primarily writes about law and politics in the United States. She writes "Supreme Court Dispatches" and "Jurisprudence" and has covered the Microsoft trial and other legal issues for Slate. In 2018, the Sidney Hillman Foundation awarded Lithwick with the Hillman Prize for Opinion & Analysis Journalism noting that she "has been the nation's best legal commentator for two decades".

Before joining Slate as a freelancer in 1999, Lithwick worked for a family law firm in Reno, Nevada. Her published work has appeared in The New Republic, The American Prospect, Elle, The Ottawa Citizen, and The Washington Post.

Early life and education
Lithwick was born to a Jewish family, in Ottawa, Ontario, Canada and is a Canadian citizen. She moved to the U.S. to study at Yale University, where she received a B.A. degree in English in 1990. As a student at Yale, she debated on the American Parliamentary Debate Association circuit as a member of the Yale Debate Association. In 1990, she and her debate partner at the time, Austan Goolsbee, were runners up for the national Team of the Year.

She went on to study law at Stanford University, where she received her J.D. degree in 1996.  She then clerked for Judge Procter Hug on the United States Court of Appeals for the Ninth Circuit.  She is Jewish and keeps a kosher home.

Career

She was a regular guest on The Al Franken Show and has been a guest columnist for The New York Times Op-Ed page.  Lithwick is Slate's legal correspondent, providing summaries and commentary on current United States Supreme Court cases. Lithwick also hosts the podcast Amicus. She received the Online News Association's award for online commentary in 2001.

Bibliography

Books
 Dahlia Lithwick. Lady Justice: Women, the Law, and the Battle to Save America, 2022. .
 Dahlia Lithwick, Brandt Goldstein. Me v. Everybody: Absurd Contracts for an Absurd World, 2003. .
 Paula Franklin, Carol Regan, Dahlia Lithwick.  Building a national immunization system: A guide to immunization services and resources, 1994. .
 Larry Berger, Dahlia Lithwick. I Will Sing Life: Voices from the Hole in the Wall Gang Camp, 1992. .

Articles

References

External links

Lithwick's columns at Slate.com
Lithwick's Amicus podcast

 

1960s births
20th-century American lawyers
20th-century American non-fiction writers
20th-century American women writers
20th-century Canadian non-fiction writers
20th-century Canadian women writers
21st-century American lawyers
21st-century American non-fiction writers
21st-century American women writers
21st-century Canadian non-fiction writers
21st-century Canadian women writers
American online publication editors
Canadian expatriate journalists in the United States
Canadian women journalists
Canadian women non-fiction writers
Jewish Canadian journalists
Journalists from Ontario
Living people
Newsweek people
Slate (magazine) people
Stanford Law School alumni
Writers from Ottawa
Yale University alumni
Year of birth missing (living people)